Women in the Wind  is an international, all female motorcycle club founded in 1979 by AMA Motorcycle Hall of Fame inductee Becky Brown.

The organization seeks to unite women motorcyclists, promote a positive image of women and motorcycling and educate its members on motorcycle safety and maintenance. It has 140 chapters across 4 continents, and is the largest women's motorcycle organization of its kind.

Founder Becky Brown's bike is on permanent display at the National Motorcycle Museum in Anamosa, Iowa.

Filmography
Behind Closed Doors: Women in the Wind. Hamilton, Karen, BBC TV (1998)

References

External links
 

Motorcycle clubs
Women's clubs in the United States
1979 establishments in Ohio
Women in Ohio
Women motorcyclists